Igiugig Airport  is a state-owned, public-use airport serving Igiugig, in the Lake and Peninsula Borough of the U.S. state of Alaska. Scheduled airline service to King Salmon Airport is provided by Peninsula Airways (PenAir).

As per Federal Aviation Administration records, this airport had 626 commercial passenger boardings (enplanements) in calendar year 2008, a decrease of 1% from the 631 enplanements in 2007. Igiugig Airport is included in the FAA's National Plan of Integrated Airport Systems (2009–2013), which categorizes it as a general aviation facility.

Facilities and aircraft 
Igiugig Airport has one runway designated 5/23 with a gravel surface measuring 3,000 by 75 feet (914 x 23 m). The airport is unattended. For the 12-month period ending December 31, 2006, the airport had 7,900 aircraft operations, an average of 21 per day: 87% general aviation and 13% air taxi.

Airlines and destinations

References

External links 
 FAA Alaska airport diagram (GIF)
 

Airports in Lake and Peninsula Borough, Alaska